The Sinister Monk is a 1965 West German thriller film directed by Harald Reinl and starring Karin Dor, Harald Leipnitz and Siegfried Lowitz. It is based on the 1927 play The Terror by Edgar Wallace and was part of a very successful series of German films inspired by his works.

It was shot at the Spandau Studios in Berlin with location shooting in London, Hamburg and Hamelin in Lower Saxony. The film's sets were designed by the art directors Walter Kutz and Wilhelm Vorwerg.

Cast
 Karin Dor as Gwendolin
 Harald Leipnitz as Inspector Bratt
 Siegfried Lowitz as Sir Richard
 Siegfried Schürenberg as Sir John
 Ilse Steppat as Lady Patricia
 Dieter Eppler as William
 Hartmut Reck as Ronny
 Kurt Waitzmann as Cunning
 Rudolf Schündler as Mr. Short
  as Monsieur d'Arol
 Uta Levka as Lola
  as Dolores
  as Mai Ling
 Uschi Glas as Mary
 Eddi Arent as Pedell Smith
 Walter Echtz as Mr. Smith / Monk
  as Servant
 Wilhelm Vorwerg as Notary

Production
It is the third film adaptation of the play The Terror by Edgar Wallace. Earlier versions were made in 1928 and 1938.

Cinematography took place from 6 October to 17 November 1965 at London and Hameln (or Hamelin).

Reception
The FSK gave the film a rating of 16 and up and found it not appropriate for screenings on public holidays.

References

Bibliography

External links 

German black-and-white films
1965 films
1960s mystery thriller films
1960s crime thriller films
German mystery thriller films
German crime thriller films
West German films
1960s German-language films
Films directed by Harald Reinl
Films based on British novels
Films set in England
Films set in London
Films shot in London
Films based on works by Edgar Wallace
Constantin Film films
Films shot at Spandau Studios
1960s German films